Lee Edwards (born 21 April 1979) was a New Zealand cricketer. He played in six first-class matches for Wellington from 1998 to 2010.

See also
 List of Wellington representative cricketers

References

External links
 

1979 births
Living people
New Zealand cricketers
Wellington cricketers
Cricketers from Wellington City